Booger Hole is an unincorporated community in northern Clay County, West Virginia, United States. It is located in the Rush Fork Valley, near the town of Ivydale.

In 1917, the community was subjected to "about a dozen" murders during a short period of time.  A special grand jury was convened to investigate the incidents, and the community itself formed what they referred to as a "mob", posting notices threatening to "get bloodhounds and detectives and run [the murderer] to the ends of the earth."  Although folklore has it that the community's name derived from this violence – "booger" being a local usage for the "boogieman" – a contemporary press account clearly shows that the community was already called "Booger Hole" at the time of the murders.

Booger Hole has been noted for its unusual place name.

https://westvirginiahauntsandlegends.com/Booger_Hole.htm

References 
Sources
 West Virginia Encyclopedia

Notes

Unincorporated communities in West Virginia
Unincorporated communities in Clay County, West Virginia